198th Division may refer to:

198th Division (1949-1961), an infantry division in the People's Liberation Army
198th Division (1969–1985), an infantry division in the People's Liberation Army
198th Infantry Division (Wehrmacht)

Military units and formations disambiguation pages